is a former Japanese football player.

Playing career
Jumpei Saito played for J3 League club; Blaublitz Akita in 2015 season.

References

External links

1992 births
Living people
Komazawa University alumni
Association football people from Akita Prefecture
Japanese footballers
J3 League players
Blaublitz Akita players
Association football midfielders
Akita FC Cambiare players